Stefán Teitur Þórðarson (born 16 October 1998) is an Icelandic professional footballer who plays as a midfielder for Silkeborg IF.

International career
Stefán has youth international games for the Icelandic U-21s. In January 2020 he made his senior international debut in a match against Canada, coming on as a 73rd minute substitute for Aron Elís Þrándarson.

International goals 
Scores and results list Iceland's goal tally first, score column indicates score after each Albert goal.

Personal life
Stefán Teitur is from a huge family of footballers. He is the son of Þórður Þórðarson, a goalkeeper who played one senior international for Iceland. Stefán Teitur's father's brother is Stefán Þór Þórðarson who played six senior internationals for Iceland, scoring once. Stefán Teitur's grandfather's brothers are Ólafur Þórðarson who was capped 72 times by Iceland, scoring 5 goals, and Teitur Þórðarson who was capped 41 times by Iceland, scoring 9 goals, before coming a well-traveled manager. Stefán Teitur's great-grandfather was Þórður Þórðarson who scored 9 goals in 16 caps for Iceland. In addition Stefán Teitur's older brother, Þórður Þorsteinn Þórðarson, is a regular player in the Icelandic top tier and his cousin, Oliver Stefánsson, son of Stefán Þór, is contracted to IFK Norrköping.

Going further back, through his great-great-grandmother (mother of Þórður Þórðarson, born 1930) he is related to Pétur Pétursson, who got 41 caps for Iceland, scoring 11 goals. Through his great-grandmother (wife of Þórður Þórðarson, born 1930) he is related to Árni Sveinsson, who got 50 caps for Iceland, scoring 4 goals, Sveinn Teitsson, who got 22 caps and 2 goals for Iceland and Sigursteinn Gíslason, who got 22 caps for Iceland.

References

External links

Thordarson, Stefan Teitar
Thordarson, Stefan Teitar
People from Akranes
Icelandic footballers
Icelandic expatriate footballers
Iceland international footballers
Úrvalsdeild karla (football) players
Íþróttabandalag Akraness players
Thordarson, Stefan Teitar
Thordarson, Stefan Teitar
Silkeborg IF players
Thordarson, Stefan Teitar
Thordarson, Stefan Teitar
Icelandic expatriate sportspeople in Denmark
Iceland under-21 international footballers